A pool noodle is a cylindrical piece of flexible, buoyant polyethylene foam. Pool noodles are used by people of all ages while swimming.

Pool noodles are useful when learning to swim, for floating, for rescue reaching, in various forms of water play, and for aquatic exercise. The pool noodle is also used for people who experience difficulties in swimming.

The pool noodle is often used to protect sharp edges and corners.

Types 

The term "water woggle" derives from Koswell Holdings trademark Water Woggle, which was first marketed as a foam water toy in the 1980s.

The term "noodle" derives from Jakks Pacific's trademark FunNoodle water product, which was created as a foam tube water toy.

Canoodle ("connect a noodle") is the polypropylene (plastic) erector set manufactured in the US by Serranoventions.

Connectors 
There are several pool noodle connectors on the market. One connector is a piece of pipe made out of foam, slightly larger than a pool noodle so that it can connect two pool noodles by encasing the end of each. There are several other connector made of food grade polypropylene and manufactured in Australia and the USA.

This noodle connector comes in the form of an erector set that is screwed into the cavity or center of the foam noodle and attaches to a six-sided noodle connector. This allows larger structures to be built from pool noodles. There exist at least two-, four- and six-hole foam connectors and a variety of polypropylene connector parts that enable users to build all types of structures and designs.

Other uses 

 

Pool noodles are similar to some types of industrial and residential foam insulation for pipes. Pipe insulation sleeves are made from a variety of materials, primarily EPDM rubber foam (which typically has greater resistance to high temperatures than expanded polyethylene foam). Despite this, pool noodles have been used as an improvised substitute for commercial pipe insulation.

Live action role-playing games often use pool noodles as foam weapons. It is generally the least expensive form of construction available and very easy to make into a safe weapon, however, pool noodle foam is more prone to break down with extended use than other types of foam.

Modern martial artists occasionally use pool noodles as tameshigiri (test cutting) targets, in lieu of more expensive targets like meat or tatami omote mats.

FIRST Robotics Competition robots use the foam from pool noodles as a bumper to protect the robots from damage during collisions.

Shoe shops use short lengths of pool noodles to support women's boots for display. Customers often use pool noodles for their own boots to prevent the boots flopping over in the closet.

Cyclists have begun to use them as a safety tool.

People have also begun to use them as protection when mailing bicycle frames, bicycle forks, and other bicycle parts.

References

Further reading

External links 
 

Physical activity and dexterity toys
Swimming equipment
Water toys